Lulu Roman (born Bertha Louise Hable on May 6, 1946) is an American comedian, singer, and author. She is known as a regular on the comedy-music show Hee Haw, which debuted in 1969.

Roman was born with a thyroid dysfunction in a home for unwed mothers and placed in Buckner Orphans Home. She attended W. W. Samuell High School in Dallas, graduating in 1964.

During her stint on Hee Haw, she went through a bout of drug addiction, which resulted in her absence from the program for several seasons during the middle portion of its long run. She cleaned up and converted to Christianity, after which she began singing. This led to a career as a singer of Southern Gospel music; Roman has recorded several albums, although she never trained as a singer. In 1999, Lulu Roman was inducted into the Country Gospel Music Hall of Fame with fellow artists Andy Griffith, Barbara Mandrell, David L. Cook, Gary S. Paxton, Loretta Lynn, Jimmy Snow, and Jody Miller.

Roman continues to perform music and stand-up comedy and also enjoys working with Compassion International, a child-development organization.  Her project Seven Times hit the number two spot on the Cash Box chart in 2010.

An album of musical standards titled At Last was released on January 15, 2013.  The album, produced by Chris Barnes and Larry Ferguson for Homesick Entertainment, featured duets with Dolly Parton, T. Graham Brown, Linda Davis, and George Jones.

References

External links
 

1946 births
Living people
21st-century American comedians
American women country singers
American country singer-songwriters
Southern gospel performers
Musicians from Dallas
Singer-songwriters from Texas
Country musicians from Texas
21st-century American women